Warhammer 40,000: Space Marine 2 is an upcoming third-person shooter hack-n-slash video game being developed by Saber Interactive and published by Focus Entertainment. It will be released for Microsoft Windows, PlayStation 5 and Xbox Series X/S in 2023. It is the sequel to Warhammer 40,000: Space Marine.

Development
The game was announced 9 December 2021 with a cinematic trailer released during The Game Awards 2021. It is confirmed that Captain Titus is making his return and has become a Primaris Space Marine. The game takes place in Games Workshop's Warhammer 40,000 universe and features the Ultramarines chapter of Space Marines. The Tyranids will be featured as enemies. It was also announced that the role of Titus had been recast (he was voiced by Mark Strong in the original game), and he will now be voiced by Clive Standen. A gameplay reveal was shown at The Game Awards 2022. The game is set to be released for Windows PC, PlayStation 5 and Xbox Series X and Series S in 2023.

References

External links
 

Upcoming video games scheduled for 2023
PlayStation 5 games
Hack and slash games
Third-person shooters
Saber Interactive games
Focus Entertainment games
Video games developed in the United States
Video game sequels
Video games set on fictional planets
S
Windows games
Xbox Series X and Series S games